Halongella fruhstorferi is a species of air-breathing land snail, a terrestrial pulmonate gastropod mollusk in the family Plectopylidae.

Distribution
The distribution of Halongella fruhstorferi includes only Kebao Island/Vân Đồn Island in Hạ Long Bay area in Quảng Ninh Province, Vietnam.

Ecology
It is a ground-dwelling species as all other plectopylid snails in Vietnam.

References
This article incorporates Creative Commons (CC-BY-4.0) text from the reference

External links

Plectopylidae
Gastropods described in 1901